The monthly Chess Life and bi-monthly Chess Life Kids (formerly School Mates and Chess Life for Kids) are the official magazines published by the United States Chess Federation (US Chess). Chess Life is advertised as the "most widely read chess magazine in the world," and reaches more than a quarter of a million readers each month. It focuses on American chess players and tournaments, instruction, human interest, and US Chess governance matters. Chess Life Kids is geared towards those under 14. A subscription to Chess Life and Chess Life Kids is currently one benefit of becoming a US Chess member or affiliate. All members are given access to the online versions of Chess Life and Chess Life Kids (including back issues). Affiliates and some membership categories also receive printed copies of Chess Life and/or Chess Life Kids.

History

The United States Chess Federation was incorporated on December 27, 1939. In the early years, it had no office and no publication. In 1945 and 1946, USCF Annual books were published. In 1946, publication of Chess Life started as a bi-weekly newspaper, usually eight or twelve pages long. In 1961, Frank Brady converted Chess Life to a slick-covered magazine.  In 1969, Chess Life merged with Chess Review, the other leading U.S. chess magazine.  The magazine was published under the title Chess Life & Review starting with the November 1969 issue until 1980 when it returned to the name Chess Life.

Editors of Chess Life
 05/1946–12/1957 Montgomery Major
 01/1958-12/1960 Fred M. Wren
 01/1961–12/1961 Frank Brady
 01/1962–05/1966 J. F. Reinhardt 
 06/1966–11/1966 Ed Edmondson and Bill Goichberg
 12/1966–––––––– Burt Hochberg and Ed Edmondson
 01/1967–10/1979 Burt Hochberg
 11/1979–01/1982 Fairfield W. Hoban
 02/1982–12/1984 Frank Elley
 01/1985–03/1988 Larry Parr
 04/1988–––––––– Fairfield W. Hoban
 05/1988–07/1989 Don Maddox
 08/1989–––––––– Boris Baczynskyj
 09/1989–10/1990 Julie Ann Desch
 11/1990–10/2000 Glenn Petersen
 11/2000–10/2003 Peter Kurzdorfer
 11/2003–12/2003 Glenn Petersen
 01/2004–03/2005 Kalev Pehme
 04/2005–02/2006 Glenn Petersen
 10/2005–02/2006 Gerald Dullea
 03/2006–05/2018 Daniel Lucas
 06/2018-05/2020 Melinda Matthews
 06/2020-present John Hartmann

Contributors to Chess Life

Some of the notable chess authors and players to write for Chess Life:

 Lev Alburt Back to Basics
 Leonard Barden  (1960s)
 Pal Benko In the Arena (1972–1981), Endgame Lab (1981–2013), and chess problem column Benko's Bafflers
 David L. Brown Key Krackers
 Robert Byrne
 John W. Collins (1950s and 1960s) Games by USCF Members 
 Alex Dunne The Check is in the Mail
 Larry Evans Evans on Chess 
 Bobby Fischer (June 1963 debut) Fischer Talks Chess
 Svetozar Gligorić Game of the Month
 Garry Kasparov (1993–1994)
 Irina Krush
 Paul Keres (1968–1975) Keres Annotates...
 Al Lawrence Former USCF Executive director and co-author of more than a dozen books
 Robert Lincoln Easy Does It (chess problems)
 William Lombardy (1958–1960s) Tidbits of Master Play 
 Abby Marshall
 Edmar Mednis
 Frank Niro Contributed at least one article, game, letter or photo to the magazine in each of the past five decades.
 Luděk Pachman Pachman On the Openings
 Bruce Pandolfini Solitaire Chess
 Susan Polgar Opening Secrets
 Miro Radojcic Observation Point
 Samuel Reshevsky The Art of Positional Play
 Michael Rohde (1991–2006) Game of the Month
 Jennifer Shahade
 Andy Soltis Chess to Enjoy
 Kester Svendsen
 László Szabó (1970s) Games from Recent Events
 Daniel Naroditsky ' 'Endgame Column' '

See also
 List of chess periodicals
 United States Chess Federation

References

External links

Chess periodicals
Chess in the United States
1946 in chess
Magazines established in 1946
Monthly magazines published in the United States
Magazines published in Tennessee